Roger Adrien Julien Renaux (3 December 1925 – 4 March 2003) was a French sports shooter. He competed in the 50 metre running target event at the 1972 Summer Olympics.

References

1925 births
2003 deaths
French male sport shooters
Olympic shooters of France
Shooters at the 1972 Summer Olympics